Hasta después de muerta ('Til After Her Death) is a 1916 Argentine silent film, shot in black and white. It was directed by Ernesto Gunche and Eduardo Martínez de la Pera and written by Florencio Parravicini. The film was released in 1916 and it had  Florencio Parravicini, Pedro Quartucci, Orfilia Rico and Enrique Serrano as the main characters. The story is told through flashbacks, which was unusual for the era.

Cast

 Florencio Parravicini
 Orfilia Rico
 Silvia Parodi
 María Fernanda Ladrón de Guevara
 Mariano Galé
 Argentino Gómez
 Enrique Serrano 
 Alímedes Nelson
 Pedro Quartucci

Plot

Beginning at the grave of a young woman, the film is a long flashback that tells the story of that young woman with a couple of medical students in a comical way at times and dramatic in others. Transcript of the multiple personality of Florencio Parravicini, scriptwriter and leading actor. It was a bourgeois and citizen theme, with touches of comedy alternating the melodramatic context.

References 

Argentine silent feature films
Argentine black-and-white films
1916 films